Karl-Erik Persson (21 March 1941 – 29 January 2016) was a Swedish politician and trade union leader.

Persson joined the Swedish Clothing Workers' Union, and by 1965 was its general secretary.  In 1972, the union merged into the Swedish Textile, Garment and Leather Workers' Union, and in 1974, Persson was elected as its president.  Under his leadership, the union lost most of its membership, as the relevant industries were in sharp decline in Sweden, and it eventually merged into the Swedish Industrial Union.  From 1984 until 1988, he additionally served as president of the International Textile, Garment and Leather Workers' Federation.

Persson was also active in the Left Party, and was elected to represent Örebro County in the 1985 Swedish general election, serving until 1998.

References

1941 births
2016 deaths
Members of the Riksdag from the Left Party (Sweden)
Members of the Riksdag 1985–1988
Members of the Riksdag 1988–1991
Members of the Riksdag 1991–1994
Members of the Riksdag 1994–1998
Swedish trade unionists
20th-century Swedish politicians